Sylvie Giry-Rousset (born 21 July 1965) is a French cross-country skier who competed at a high level from 1992 to 1994.

Rousset was born in Grenoble, Isère.  Competing in two Winter Olympics, she earned her best results at the 1992 Games in Albertville with a fifth in the 4 × 5 km relay and 28th in the 15 km event.

Giry Rousset's best finish at the FIS Nordic World Ski Championships was 37th in the 15 km event at Falun in 1993. Her best World Cup finish as 29th twice in 1992.

Cross-country skiing results
All results are sourced from the International Ski Federation (FIS).

Olympic Games

World Championships

World Cup

Season standings

References

External links

Women's 4 x 5 km cross-country relay Olympic results: 1976-2002 

1965 births
Cross-country skiers at the 1992 Winter Olympics
Cross-country skiers at the 1994 Winter Olympics
French female cross-country skiers
Living people
Sportspeople from Grenoble
Olympic cross-country skiers of France